Room to Breathe is a studio album by American musician Delbert McClinton, released in 2002 on New West Records. It was recorded at Sound Emporium, Nashville, Tennessee with additional recording at Bismeaux Studio, Austin, Texas, and was produced by Gary Nicholson and Delbert McClinton.

Track listing

Personnel
Delbert McClinton - vocals, guitar, harmonica
Todd Sharp - lead guitar, acoustic guitar, baritone guitar, background vocals
Bill Campbell - rhythm guitar
Gary Nicholson - acoustic guitar, background vocals
Kevin McKendree - organ, electric piano, piano
Mark Jordan - organ, piano
George Hawkins - bass, background vocals
Glenn Worf - upright bass
Lynn Williams - drums, percussion, background vocals
Terry Townson - trumpet
Billy Huber - trombone
Jim Horn - baritone saxophone
Jimmy Bowland - tenor saxophone
Don Wise - tenor saxophone
James Pennebaker - fiddle, steel guitar, rhythm guitar, background vocals
Carl Gorodetzky - violin
Pam Sixfin - violin
Jim Grosjean - viola
John Catchings - cello
The Nashville String Machine - strings
Jessi Alexander - background vocals
Marcia Ball - background vocals
Ray Benson - background vocals
Bekka Bramlett - background vocals
Guy Clark - background vocals
Rodney Crowell - background vocals
Dee Dee Day - background vocals
Steve Earle - background vocals
Joe Ely - background vocals
Jimmie Dale Gilmore - background vocals
Emmylou Harris - background vocals
Butch Hancock - background vocals
Kimmie Rhodes - background vocals
Billy Joe Shaver - background vocals
Heather Waters - background vocals

Chart performance

References

2002 albums
Delbert McClinton albums